Məzrəli is a village and municipality in the Imishli Rayon of Azerbaijan.  It has a population of 3,320.

References

Populated places in Imishli District